Nefteyugansk United Airline Transportation Company is an airline based in Nefteyugansk, Khanty–Mansi Autonomous Okrug, Russia. Its main base is Nefteyugansk Airport.

Code data 
ICAO Code: NFT
Callsign: Nefteavia

History 
The airline was established and started operations in 1975. It was formerly named Nefteyugansk United Aviation Squadron.

Fleet 
The Nefteyugansk Air Enterprise fleet includes the following aircraft (at March 2007):
5 Kamov Ka-32T
12 Mil Mi-8T
8 Mil Mi-17

External links 
Nefteyugansk Air Enterprise

References 

Airlines of Russia
Former Aeroflot divisions
Airlines established in 1975
Companies based in Khanty-Mansi Autonomous Okrug